dATP(dGTP)—DNA purinetransferase is an enzyme with systematic name dATP(dGTP):depurinated-DNA purine transferase. This enzyme catalyses the following chemical reaction

 (1) dATP + depurinated DNA  deoxyribose triphosphate + DNA
 (2) dGTP + depurinated DNA  deoxyribose triphosphate + DNA

The purine residue is transferred on to the apurinic site forming a normal glycosylic bond.

References

External links 
 

EC 2.6.99